Stenkullens GoIK is a Swedish football club located in Stenkullen.

Background
Stenkullens GoIK currently plays in Division 4 Göteborg A which is the sixth tier of Swedish football. They play their home matches at the Stenkullen IP in Stenkullen.

The club is affiliated to Göteborgs Fotbollförbund.

The women's soccer team was started in 1970, and played six seasons in the Swedish top division between 1979–1986. and won the district championship in 1979 and 1981.

Monika Jacobsson scored 236 goals for the women's team between 1973–1975, and played for the Swedish national team. Goalkeeper Sabine Piltorp also played for Sweden, however that occurred when her club team was Jitex BK.

Season to season

Footnotes

External links
 Stenkullen GoIK – Official website
 Stenkullen GoIK on Facebook

Football clubs in Gothenburg
Association football clubs established in 1926
1926 establishments in Sweden
Football clubs in Västra Götaland County